The Wolseley 6/99 and 6/110 were the final large Wolseley cars. Styled by Pininfarina with additions by BMC staff stylists, the basic vehicle was also sold under two of BMC's other marques as the Austin A99 Westminster and Vanden Plas Princess 3-Litre. Production began in 1959 and the cars were updated and renamed for 1961. The Wolseley remained in production as the Wolseley 6/110 through to 1968.

The cars were also marketed in Denmark as the Wolseley 300.

There were two other Farina-designed car lines launched by BMC at the same time — the compact Austin A40 Farina and midsized Wolseley 15/60 and derivatives. Although similar looking, the latter shares no body parts and few other parts with the big Wolseley.

Wolseley 6/99

The first generation of the large Farinas was introduced with the Austin A99 Westminster, with the Wolseley 6/99 following shortly after in 1959 to replace the 6/90. It used the same 2.9 L (2912 cc) C-Series straight-6, twin SU carburettor engine from the Austin-Healey 3000.

The suspension was the conventional BMC arrangement of coil springs and wishbones at the front with a live axle and semi elliptic leaf springs at the rear. An anti-roll bar was fitted at the front. Lockheed  disc brakes were fitted at the front with  drum brakes at the rear and vacuum servo assistance.

The interior was finished in luxurious style to distance the Wolseley from its Austin stablemate. The dashboard was polished wood as were the door cappings. Leather upholstery was used on the two front seats and rear bench seat which had a fold down central arm rest. A choice of single or duo-tone colour schemes was offered.

Wolseley 6/99s with left hand drive shipped to Canada used the 4-speed floor mounted shift with overdrive identical to that in the Austin-Healey 100/6 and 3000.

On the home market, as tested with overdrive, it cost £1254 including taxes of £369.

Wolseley 6/110

The 6/99 was replaced by the Wolseley 6/110 in 1961. It used the same engine but now tuned to give . For manual transmission cars, the gear lever was moved from the steering column to the floor. Hydrosteer variable ratio power steering and air conditioning were options from July 1962. 

A Mark II model was released in 1964 with smaller  wheels and a 4-speed transmission with overdrive available as an option. Production of the Mark II ended in March 1968. Only the Austin was replaced directly, with the unsuccessful Austin 3-litre, which remained in production until 1971. Luxurious Wolseley and Vanden Plas versions of the 3-litre both reached prototype stage, but went no further.

References

External links

Cambridge-Oxford Owners Club
6/99 profile at the Wolseley Owners Club
6/110 profile at the Wolseley Owners club

6 99
Luxury vehicles
Cars introduced in 1959
Cars discontinued in 1968
1960s cars
Rear-wheel-drive vehicles
Sedans